Friedrich Vierhapper (1844 – 1903) was an Austrian amateur botanist. He was the father of botanist Friedrich Karl Max Vierhapper (1876–1932), botanical abbreviation- "Vierh.".

He obtained his education in Salzburg and Vienna, later working as an instructor at a high school in Weidenau (1875-1881) and at the gymnasium in Ried im Innkreis (1881-1895).

Bibliography 
 Prodromus einer Flora des Innkreises in Oberösterreich Ried : Druck von Josef Fridrich & Comp., 1885–1889.

References

1903 deaths
1844 births
19th-century Austrian botanists